Suphakorn Sriphothong (also known as Plapodd or Pod, born 23 October 1993)  is a Thai actor. He is known for his main roles as Sun in GMMTV's Dark Blue Kiss (2019) and Tonhon in Tonhon Chonlatee (2020).

Early life and education 
Suphakorn Sriphothong was born on 23 October 1993 in Bangkok, Thailand. He graduated high school from Princess Sirindhorn's College and earned his bachelor's degree of Business Administration (Culinary Arts and Kitchen Management) from Dusit Thani College.

Career
Podd won a bronze medal of freestyle poultry cooking competition (Junior) in the individual category from Thailand's International Culinary Cup (TICC) 2012. He then opened a fried chicken shop named "Deep Fly", which he promoted in the GMMTV program The Route in 2016.

He began his entertainment career in 2018 as an artist under GMMTV. He made his acting debut with the 2018 BL drama Kiss Me Again, playing Sun. In 2019, he played a supporting role in the drama 3 Will Be Free. In the same year, he starred in the BL drama Dark Blue Kiss where he reprised his role as Sun as a main role.

In 2020, he started to gain increased attention and popularity with his role as Tonhon in the drama Tonhon Chonlatee. The drama was a success and hit in Thailand and 33 countries where it achieved a cult following. He received positive reviews for his portrayal of Tonhon which led to increased popularity for him.

Filmography

Television

References

External links 
 

1993 births
Living people
Suphakorn Sriphothong
Suphakorn Sriphothong
Suphakorn Sriphothong
Suphakorn Sriphothong
Suphakorn Sriphothong
Suphakorn Sriphothong
Suphakorn Sriphothong